Stenoma is a genus of moths. The type species is Stenoma litura, which was described by Philipp Christoph Zeller in 1839.

Species

 Stenoma abductella (Walker, 1864)
 Stenoma acontiella (Walker, 1864)
 Stenoma acratodes Meyrick, 1916
 Stenoma adminiculata Meyrick, 1915
 Stenoma adoratrix Meyrick, 1925
 Stenoma adulans Meyrick, 1925
 Stenoma adustella (Walker, 1864)
 Stenoma adytodes Meyrick, 1925
 Stenoma affirmatella Busck, 1914
 Stenoma aggregata Meyrick, 1916
 Stenoma albida (Walker, 1864)
 Stenoma alligans (Butler, 1877)
 Stenoma alluvialis Meyrick, 1925
 Stenoma ambiens Meyrick, 1922
 Stenoma amphitera Meyrick, 1913
 Stenoma anaxesta Meyrick, 1915
 Stenoma ancillaris Meyrick, 1916
 Stenoma anconitis Meyrick, 1915
 Stenoma ancylacma Meyrick, 1925
 Stenoma anetodes Meyrick, 1915
 Stenoma annosa (Butler, 1877)
 Stenoma antitacta Meyrick, 1925
 Stenoma aphrophanes Meyrick, 1929
 Stenoma aplytopis Meyrick, 1930
 Stenoma apsorrhoa Meyrick, 1915
 Stenoma aptila Meyrick, 1915
 Stenoma argillacea (Zeller, 1877)
 Stenoma argospora Meyrick, 1915
 Stenoma armata (Zeller, 1877)
 Stenoma arridens Meyrick, 1931
 Stenoma ascodes Meyrick, 1915
 Stenoma assignata Meyrick, 1918
 Stenoma aterpes Walsingham, 1913
 Stenoma augescens Meyrick, 1925
 Stenoma auricoma Meyrick, 1930
 Stenoma aztecana Walsingham, 1913
 Stenoma balanoptis Meyrick, 1932
 Stenoma baliandra Meyrick, 1915
 Stenoma bathrocentra Meyrick, 1915
 Stenoma bathrogramma (Meyrick, 1912)
 Stenoma bathyntis Meyrick, 1931
 Stenoma benigna Meyrick, 1916
 Stenoma biannulata Meyrick, 1930
 Stenoma bicensa Meyrick, 1915
 Stenoma biseriata (Zeller, 1877)
 Stenoma bisignata Meyrick, 1916
 Stenoma blandula Meyrick, 1915
 Stenoma bryocosma Meyrick, 1916
 Stenoma bryoxyla Meyrick, 1915
 Stenoma byssina (Zeller, 1855)
 Stenoma bythitis Meyrick, 1915
 Stenoma caesarea Meyrick, 1915
 Stenoma caesia Meyrick, 1915
 Stenoma callicoma Meyrick, 1916
 Stenoma camarodes Meyrick, 1915
 Stenoma camptospila Meyrick, 1925
 Stenoma cana (Felder & Rogenhofer, 1875)
 Stenoma canonias (Meyrick, 1913)
 Stenoma capnobola Meyrick, 1913
 Stenoma caryodesma Meyrick, 1925
 Stenoma cassigera Meyrick, 1915
 Stenoma castellana Meyrick, 1916
 Stenoma catenifer Walsingham, 1912
 Stenoma catharmosta Meyrick, 1915
 Stenoma cathosiota Meyrick, 1925
 Stenoma chalepa Walsingham, 1913
 Stenoma chalybaeella (Walker, 1864)
 Stenoma charitarcha Meyrick, 1915
 Stenoma chionogramma (Meyrick, 1909)
 Stenoma chloroloba Meyrick, 1915
 Stenoma chloroplaca (Meyrick, 1915)
 Stenoma chloroxantha Meyrick, 1925
 Stenoma cholerocrossa Meyrick, 1930
 Stenoma chromatopa Meyrick, 1930
 Stenoma chromotechna Meyrick, 1925
 Stenoma citroxantha Meyrick, 1916
 Stenoma claripennis Busck, 1914
 Stenoma clysmographa Meyrick, 1925
 Stenoma codicata Meyrick, 1916
 Stenoma colligata Meyrick, 1915
 Stenoma collybista (Meyrick, 1915)
 Stenoma columbaris Meyrick, 1909
 Stenoma comma Busck, 1911
 Stenoma commutata (Meyrick, 1926)
 Stenoma complanella (Walsingham, 1891)
 Stenoma completella (Walker, 1864)
 Stenoma compsocharis Meyrick, 1925
 Stenoma compsocoma Meyrick, 1930
 Stenoma condemnatrix Meyrick, 1930
 Stenoma congrua Meyrick, 1925
 Stenoma coniophaea Meyrick, 1930
 Stenoma consociella (Walker, 1864)
 Stenoma conveniens Meyrick, 1925
 Stenoma convexicostata (Zeller, 1877)
 Stenoma corvula (Meyrick, 1912)
 Stenoma crambina Busck, 1920
 Stenoma crepitans Meyrick, 1918
 Stenoma crocosticta Meyrick, 1925
 Stenoma crypsangela Meyrick, 1932
 Stenoma crypsastra Meyrick, 1915
 Stenoma crypsetaera (Meyrick, 1925)
 Stenoma curtipennis (Butler, 1877)
 Stenoma cyanarcha Meyrick, 1915
 Stenoma cycnographa Meyrick, 1930
 Stenoma cymbalista Meyrick, 1918
 Stenoma cyphoxantha Meyrick, 1931
 Stenoma dasyneura Meyrick, 1922
 Stenoma decora (Zeller, 1854)
 Stenoma delphinodes Meyrick, 1925
 Stenoma deltomis Meyrick, 1925
 Stenoma deuteropa Meyrick, 1931
 Stenoma diametrica Meyrick, 1926
 Stenoma dicentra Meyrick, 1913
 Stenoma dilinopa Meyrick, 1925
 Stenoma diorista (Meyrick, 1929)
 Stenoma discrepans Meyrick, 1925
 Stenoma dispilella (Walker, 1866)
 Stenoma dorcadopa Meyrick, 1916
 Stenoma dryaula Meyrick, 1925
 Stenoma dryoconis Meyrick, 1930
 Stenoma dryocosma Meyrick, 1918
 Stenoma elaeurga Meyrick, 1926
 Stenoma embythia Meyrick, 1916
 Stenoma eminens Meyrick, 1918
 Stenoma emphanes Meyrick, 1917
 Stenoma emphatica Meyrick, 1916
 Stenoma empyrota Meyrick, 1915
 Stenoma enumerata Meyrick, 1932
 Stenoma epicnesta Meyrick, 1915
 Stenoma epicta Walsingham, 1912
 Stenoma epipacta Meyrick, 1915
 Stenoma eumenodora Meyrick, 1937
 Stenoma eusticta Meyrick, 1916
 Stenoma eva Meyrick, 1915
 Stenoma evanescens (Butler, 1877)
 Stenoma exarata (Zeller, 1854)
 Stenoma exempta Meyrick, 1925
 Stenoma exhalata Meyrick, 1915
 Stenoma explicita Meyrick, 1930
 Stenoma externella (Walker, 1864)
 Stenoma fallax (Butler, 1877)
 Stenoma fassliana (Dognin, 1913)
 Stenoma farraria Meyrick, 1915
 Stenoma fenestra Busck, 1914
 Stenoma ferculata Meyrick, 1922
 Stenoma ferrocanella (Walker, 1864)
 Stenoma finitrix Meyrick, 1925
 Stenoma flavicosta (Felder & Rogenhofer, 1875)
 Stenoma frondifer Busck, 1914
 Stenoma fulcrata Meyrick, 1915
 Stenoma funerana (Sepp, [1847])
 Stenoma fusistrigella (Walker, 1864)
 Stenoma futura Meyrick, 1913
 Stenoma gemellata Meyrick, 1916
 Stenoma grandaeva (Zeller, 1854)
 Stenoma graphica Busck, 1920
 Stenoma gymnastis Meyrick, 1915
 Stenoma halmas Meyrick, 1925
 Stenoma haploxyla Meyrick, 1915
 Stenoma harpoceros Meyrick, 1930
 Stenoma hectorea (Meyrick, 1915)
 Stenoma hemilampra Meyrick, 1915
 Stenoma hemiphanta Meyrick, 1925
 Stenoma herifuga Meyrick, 1932
 Stenoma hesmarcha (Meyrick, 1930)
 Stenoma heteroxantha Meyrick, 1931
 Stenoma himerodes Meyrick, 1916
 Stenoma holcadica Meyrick, 1916
 Stenoma holophaea (Meyrick, 1916)
 Stenoma homala Walsingham, 1912
 Stenoma hopfferi (Zeller, 1854)
 Stenoma hoplitica Meyrick, 1925
 Stenoma horocharis Meyrick, 1930
 Stenoma horocyma Meyrick, 1925
 Stenoma hospitalis Meyrick, 1915
 Stenoma hyacinthitis Meyrick, 1930
 Stenoma hyalocryptis Meyrick, 1930
 Stenoma hydraena Meyrick, 1916
 Stenoma hypocirrha Meyrick, 1930
 Stenoma iatma Meyrick, 1915
 Stenoma icteropis Meyrick, 1925
 Stenoma immersa Walsingham, 1913
 Stenoma immunda (Zeller, 1854)
 Stenoma impressella (Busck, 1914)
 Stenoma impurata Meyrick, 1915
 Stenoma inardescens Meyrick, 1925
 Stenoma inflata (Butler, 1877)
 Stenoma infusa Meyrick, 1916
 Stenoma injucunda Meyrick, 1925
 Stenoma invulgata Meyrick, 1915
 Stenoma iocoma Meyrick, 1915
 Stenoma iopercna Meyrick, 1932
 Stenoma iostalacta Meyrick, 1925
 Stenoma irascens Meyrick, 1930
 Stenoma jucunda Meyrick, 1915
 Stenoma klemaniana (Stoll, [1781])
 Stenoma lapidea Meyrick, 1916
 Stenoma lapilella (Busck, 1914)
 Stenoma latitans (Dognin, 1905)
 Stenoma lavata Walsingham, 1913
 Stenoma leptogma Meyrick, 1925
 Stenoma leucana (Sepp, [1844])
 Stenoma leucaniella (Walker, 1864)
 Stenoma libertina Meyrick, 1916
 Stenoma litura Zeller, 1839
 Stenoma lucidiorella (Walker, 1864)
 Stenoma luctifica (Zeller, 1877)
 Stenoma macraulax Meyrick, 1930
 Stenoma macroptycha Meyrick, 1930
 Stenoma melanesia Meyrick, 1912
 Stenoma melanixa Meyrick, 1912
 Stenoma meligrapta Meyrick, 1925
 Stenoma melinopa Meyrick, 1925
 Stenoma melixesta Meyrick, 1925
 Stenoma meridogramma Meyrick, 1930
 Stenoma methystica Meyrick, 1930
 Stenoma metroleuca Meyrick, 1930
 Stenoma meyeriana (Stoll, [1781])
 Stenoma milichodes Meyrick, 1915
 Stenoma minor Busck, 1914
 Stenoma mniodora Meyrick, 1925
 Stenoma modicola Meyrick, 1911
 Stenoma mundula Meyrick, 1916
 Stenoma muscula (Zeller, 1877)
 Stenoma myrrhinopa (Meyrick, 1932)
 Stenoma nebrita Walsingham, 1913
 Stenoma negotiosa Meyrick, 1925
 Stenoma neopercna Meyrick, 1930
 Stenoma neoptila Meyrick, 1925
 Stenoma neurocentra Meyrick, 1925
 Stenoma neurotona (Meyrick, 1915)
 Stenoma nigricans (Busck, 1914)
 Stenoma niphacma Meyrick, 1916
 Stenoma niphochlaena (Meyrick, 1926)
 Stenoma nubilella (Möschler, 1882)
 Stenoma nycteropa Meyrick, 1915
 Stenoma oblita (Butler, 1877)
 Stenoma obovata Meyrick, 1931
 Stenoma ochlodes Walsingham, 1912
 Stenoma ochricollis (Zeller, 1877)
 Stenoma ochropa Walsingham, 1913
 Stenoma ochrothicata Meyrick, 1925
 Stenoma orneopis Meyrick, 1925
 Stenoma orthocapna Meyrick, 1912
 Stenoma orthographa Meyrick, 1925
 Stenoma ortholampra Meyrick, 1930
 Stenoma ovatella (Walker, 1864)
 Stenoma oxyschista Meyrick, 1925
 Stenoma oxyscia Meyrick, 1922
 Stenoma pantogenes Meyrick, 1930
 Stenoma paracapna Meyrick, 1915
 Stenoma paraplecta Meyrick, 1925
 Stenoma pardalodes Meyrick, 1918
 Stenoma paropta Meyrick, 1916
 Stenoma patellifera Meyrick, 1931
 Stenoma patens Meyrick, 1913
 Stenoma peccans (Butler, 1877)
 Stenoma periaula Meyrick, 1916
 Stenoma peridesma Meyrick, 1925
 Stenoma perirrhoa Meyrick, 1930
 Stenoma perjecta Meyrick, 1931
 Stenoma peronia Busck, 1913
 Stenoma persita Meyrick, 1915
 Stenoma pertinax Meyrick, 1915
 Stenoma phaeomistis Meyrick, 1925
 Stenoma phalacropa Meyrick, 1932
 Stenoma phylloxantha Meyrick, 1933
 Stenoma picrantis Meyrick, 1930
 Stenoma picta (Zeller, 1854)
 Stenoma plagosa (Zeller, 1877)
 Stenoma platyphylla Meyrick, 1916
 Stenoma platyterma Meyrick, 1915
 Stenoma plurima Walsingham, 1912
 Stenoma porphyrastis Meyrick, 1915
 Stenoma praecauta Meyrick, 1916
 Stenoma procritica Meyrick, 1925
 Stenoma promotella (Zeller, 1877)
 Stenoma psalmographa Meyrick, 1931
 Stenoma psilomorpha Meyrick, 1915
 Stenoma ptychobathra Meyrick, 1930
 Stenoma ptychocentra Meyrick, 1916
 Stenoma ptychophthalma Meyrick, 1930
 Stenoma pustulatella (Walker, 1864)
 Stenoma pyramidea Walsingham, 1913
 Stenoma pyrrhias Meyrick, 1915
 Stenoma pyrrhonota Meyrick, 1915
 Stenoma receptella (Walker, 1864)
 Stenoma recondita Meyrick, 1915
 Stenoma redintegrata Meyrick, 1925
 Stenoma regesta Meyrick, 1926
 Stenoma relata Meyrick, 1925
 Stenoma residuella (Zeller, 1877)
 Stenoma reticens Meyrick, 1917
 Stenoma rhodocolpa Meyrick, 1916
 Stenoma rhothiodes Meyrick, 1915
 Stenoma rosa (Busck, 1911)
 Stenoma sagax Busck, 1914
 Stenoma salome Busck, 1911
 Stenoma salubris Meyrick, 1925
 Stenoma satelles Meyrick, 1925
 Stenoma sciogama Meyrick, 1930
 Stenoma scitiorella (Walker, 1864)
 Stenoma scoliandra Meyrick, 1915
 Stenoma scoriodes (Meyrick, 1915)
 Stenoma secundata Meyrick, 1925
 Stenoma sematopa Meyrick, 1915
 Stenoma sequestra Meyrick, 1918
 Stenoma sericata (Butler, 1877)
 Stenoma sesquitertia (Zeller, 1854)
 Stenoma sexmaculata (Dognin, 1904)
 Stenoma simplex Busck, 1914
 Stenoma simulatrix Meyrick, 1914
 Stenoma sinuata (Fabricius, 1798)
 Stenoma sommerella (Zeller, 1877)
 Stenoma spodinopis Meyrick, 1931
 Stenoma stabilis (Butler, 1877)
 Stenoma staudingerana (Maassen, 1890)
 Stenoma stephanodes Meyrick, 1931
 Stenoma stolida Meyrick, 1911
 Stenoma straminella (Walker, 1864)
 Stenoma strenuella (Walker, 1864)
 Stenoma striatella Busck, 1914
 Stenoma strigivenata (Butler, 1877)
 Stenoma stupefacta Meyrick, 1916
 Stenoma subita (Meyrick, 1925)
 Stenoma sublimbata (Zeller, 1877)
 Stenoma submersa Meyrick, 1915
 Stenoma subnotatella (Walker, 1864)
 Stenoma suffumata (Walsingham, 1897)
 Stenoma surinamella (Möschler, 1883)
 Stenoma sustentata Meyrick, 1926
 Stenoma symmicta Walsingham, 1913
 Stenoma symphonica Meyrick, 1916
 Stenoma symposias (Meyrick, 1915)
 Stenoma syngraphopis Meyrick, 1930
 Stenoma tetrabola Meyrick, 1913
 Stenoma thaleropa Meyrick, 1916
 Stenoma thespia Meyrick, 1915
 Stenoma thologramma (Meyrick, 1932)
 Stenoma thoristes Busck, 1911
 Stenoma thylacandra Meyrick, 1915
 Stenoma tolmeta Walsingham, 1912
 Stenoma trichocolpa Meyrick, 1915
 Stenoma trichorda Meyrick, 1912
 Stenoma trilineata (Butler, 1877)
 Stenoma tripustulata (Zeller, 1854)
 Stenoma trirecta Meyrick, 1931
 Stenoma tristrigata (Zeller, 1854)
 Stenoma tyrocrossa Meyrick, 1925
 Stenoma ulosema Meyrick, 1930
 Stenoma umbrinervis Meyrick, 1930
 Stenoma uncticoma Meyrick, 1916
 Stenoma unguentata Meyrick, 1930
 Stenoma uruguayensis (Berg, 1885)
 Stenoma vaccula Walsingham, 1913
 Stenoma vaga (Butler, 1877)
 Stenoma vapida (Butler, 1877)
 Stenoma vasifera Meyrick, 1925
 Stenoma ventilatrix Meyrick, 1916
 Stenoma vexata Meyrick, 1915
 Stenoma vinifera Meyrick, 1915
 Stenoma viridiceps (Felder & Rogenhofer, 1875)
 Stenoma vita (Busck, 1911)
 Stenoma vitreola Meyrick, 1925
 Stenoma vivax Busck, 1914
 Stenoma volitans Meyrick, 1925
 Stenoma xanthophaeella (Walker, 1864)
 Stenoma xylinopa (Meyrick, 1925)
 Stenoma ybyrajubu Becker, 1971
 Stenoma zephyritis Meyrick, 1925
 Stenoma zobeida Meyrick, 1931

References

 , 1969: Bredin-Archbold-Smithsonian biological survey of Dominica: West Indian Stenomidae (Lepidoptera: Gelechioidea). Smithsonian Contributions to Zoology 4: 1–21. Full article: 

 
Stenomatinae